Eremomastax is a genus of flowering plants belonging to the family Acanthaceae.

Its native range is Tropical Africa.

Species:
 Eremomastax speciosa (Hochst.) Cufod.

References

Acanthaceae
Acanthaceae genera